Balyakalasakhi (meaning childhood companion) is a 1967 Malayalam film, directed by J. Sasikumar. It is an adaptation of Vaikom Muhammad Basheer's famous novel of the same name. Basheer himself wrote the screenplay and dialogues. Balyakalasakhi and Bhargavi Nilayam (1964) are the only films for which Basheer has written the screenplay. The film's story revolves around Majeed and Suhra, who have been in love with each other from childhood.

Cast

 Prem Nazir as Majeed
 Sheela as Suhara
 Kottarakkara Sreedharan Nair
 Meena
 Bahadoor
 T. R. Omana
 Usharani
 T. S. Muthaiah
 Manavalan Joseph
 Nalini
 Baby Usha
 P. J. Antony (guest appearance)

Soundtrack
The music was composed by M. S. Baburaj and the lyrics were written by P. Bhaskaran.

References

External links
 
 Balyakalasakhi songbook
 A write-up on the film by Jacob John and B. Vijayakumar

Films based on Indian novels
1960s Malayalam-language films
Vaikom Muhammad Basheer
Films directed by J. Sasikumar